The Frank S. Sander House ("Springbough") is a  house located in Stamford, Connecticut. It was designed by the noted architect Frank Lloyd Wright in 1952.

Springbough is composed of mahogany, burnt face brick and glass and is built into the side of a rocky ledge. The house was restored in 1996 by Anne Del Gaudio.

In 2002 the house was toured by participants of the Frank Lloyd Wright Building Conservancy meeting in New York.

References 

 Storrer, William Allin. The Frank Lloyd Wright Companion. University Of Chicago Press, 2006,  (S.354)
 Frank Lloyd Wright Building Conservancy 2002 Program

Frank Lloyd Wright buildings
Houses in Stamford, Connecticut